This is a list of crowd figures for 2022 Australian football codes.

(Updated August 7, 2022)

Several football codes have national competitions in Australia. Specifically, the list primarily includes home matches in the following seasons:

 The 2022 Australian Football League season (Aussie Rules)
 The 2022 National Rugby League season
 The 2022 State of Origin series

As well as, where applicable, data from:

 The 2022 Super Rugby Pacific season
 The 2021–22 A-League Men

National Rugby League Attendances

Club attendances 

Note: Includes Magic Round individual game figures (as listed below) as this is how they are recorded by the NRL.

Updated 7 August (Missing MEL v GLD and SOU v WAR R21 games)

Highest game attendances

Magic Round game by game

2022 State of Origin Series Attendances

Series Crowds

Home Average Crowds

Australian Football League Attendances

Top Crowds

Code Comparison

Average Crowds 
Notes:

 Rugby league indicated by use of league icons (colour boxes)
 Australian rules indicated by no colours

Top Crowds 
Notes:

 Crowds of 30,000 or more
 Rugby league indicated by use of league icons (colour boxes)
 Australian rules indicated by no colours

References 

2022 in Australian rugby league
2022 in Australian rugby union
2022 in Australian soccer
2022 in Australian rules football
2022